Seung-eun, also spelled Seung-un, or Sung-un, is a Korean unisex given name. The meaning differs based on the hanja used to write each syllable of the name. There are 17 hanja with the reading "seung" and 30 hanja with the reading "eun" on the South Korean government's official list of hanja which may be used in given names.

People with this name include:

Seung Eun Kim (born 1976), American male animator
Euna Seung-eun Lee (born 1972), South Korean-born American female journalist
Oh Seung-eun (오승은, born 1979), South Korean actress

See also
List of Korean given names

References

Korean unisex given names